

The Black Hawk Bridge spans the Mississippi River, joining the town of Lansing, in Allamakee County, Iowa, to rural Crawford County, Wisconsin. It is the northernmost Mississippi River bridge in Iowa.

Named for Chief Black Hawk, it is popularly referred to as the "Lansing bridge". It carries Iowa Highway 9 and Wisconsin Highway 82.

This riveted cantilever through truss bridge has one of the more unusual designs of any Mississippi River bridge. Construction started in 1929 and was completed in 1931. The designer and chief engineer was Melvin B. Stone. The McClintic-Marshall Company of Chicago erected the trusses. The steel came from the Inland Steel Company.

The Wisconsin approach has a long causeway over Winneshiek bottoms (sloughs, ponds, and backwaters) before ramping up to the bridge itself. The main shipping channel is on the Iowa side. The Iowa approach is rather abrupt, going from a  city street straight up a steep ramp onto the bridge.

Originally a privately built and operated bridge owned by the Iowa-Wisconsin Bridge Company, it was closed between 1945 and 1957, due to damage from ice damming, and lacking funds to repair the bridge, the company went out of business. The two states acquired the bridge and repaired it.

In August 2011 the bridge was briefly closed for repairs after a crack was found in a floor beam.

Replacement

The bridge has a sufficiency rating of 39.9 percent, which mainly reflects its obsolete nature. The Iowa Department of Transportation is planning for a replacement bridge to start construction in 2024. It was revealed during a meeting on June 15, 2021, that the replacement bridge's design would look extremely similar to the current bridge's design while either retaining the pier's design or adopting a newer wave design.

In popular culture 
The bridge was featured in a scene from the 1999 film The Straight Story, when Alvin Straight is depicted crossing the Mississippi River near the end of his  journey.

See also
List of crossings of the Upper Mississippi River
List of bridges documented by the Historic American Engineering Record in Iowa
List of bridges documented by the Historic American Engineering Record in Wisconsin

Notes

References
Iowa Department of Transportation, retrieved July 28, 2007
Black Hawk Bridge Superb site, with pictures and statistics, retrieved July 28, 2007
NationalBridges.com, retrieved August 7, 2007

Bridges completed in 1931
Bridges in Allamakee County, Iowa
Buildings and structures in Crawford County, Wisconsin
Bridges over the Mississippi River
Historic American Engineering Record in Iowa
Historic American Engineering Record in Wisconsin
Road bridges in Iowa
Road bridges in Wisconsin
Great River Road
Cantilever bridges in the United States
Steel bridges in the United States
Interstate vehicle bridges in the United States